Oeceoclades longebracteata is a species of terrestrial orchid in the genus Oeceoclades that is endemic to southwestern and south-central Madagascar. It was first described by the French botanists Jean Marie Bosser and Philippe Morat in 2001. The specific epithet longebracteata refers to the long bracts found along the inflorescence.

Description
There are one or two thick, fleshy leaves on each pseudobulb that are brownish green with darker green or purplish-brown markings. The inflorescence has a series of five to seven narrow, linear bracts, which are pale yellow stained with green spots. The inflorescence is a simple raceme with about 20 to 25 flowers with green sepals and petals with purple veins.

Oeceoclades longebracteata is a terrestrial species found growing on gritty sand in clear undergrowth in deciduous forests. It is similar to O. decaryana in floral morphology but is easily distinguished from that species by the very narrow leaves and the long, linear floral bracts.

References

longebracteata
Endemic flora of Madagascar
Plants described in 2001